M-331 was an unsigned state trunkline highway in the U.S. state of Michigan located within the city of Kalamazoo. It ran from the southern city limits north into downtown Kalamazoo. This was one of many highways to be established or realigned as a result of a rationalization process initiated in 1998 during the tenure of Governor John Engler. M-331 used streets in Kalamazoo that were once part of US Highway 131 (US 131) before a freeway was built that bypassed the downtown area. In 2019, the City of Kalamazoo and the Michigan Department of Transportation (MDOT) agreed to transfer control of various streets from state to city jurisdiction, and M-331 was decommissioned as a result.

Route description
M-331 ran along Westnedge Avenue from the intersection of Kilgore Road on the Kalamazoo–Portage city limit near an exit with Interstate 94 (I-94). It ran north from this endpoint, which is unconnected to the rest of the trunkline system, to the vicinity of Crane Park in Kalamazoo along Westnedge Avenue. M-331 ran west of Blanche Hull Park and east of the Kalamazoo Country Club. It also passed immediately next to the Mt. Ever-Rest Cemetery. From Crane Park northward, Park Street carried the northbound traffic while Westnedge Avenue is restricted to the southbound traffic. Along this pairing of one-way streets, M-331 passed South Westnedge Park and met Bronson Park at the intersection of Michigan Avenue (formerly eastbound Business Loop Interstate 94/M-43 and northbound Business US Highway 131) downtown. The M-331 designation ended at Michigan Avenue, and Westnedge Avenue and Park Street continued north as Bus. US 131.

History
The routing of M-331 was part of the long-time alignment of US 131 before that highway was relocated onto a freeway west of Kalamazoo in the 1960s. The trunkline was designated on October 1, 1998, as part of a rationalization process started by Governor John Engler designed to transfer control of roads and streets in Michigan of economic importance to the state. The highway was not shown on the official state map published by the MDOT, but it was labeled on the truck operator's map as an "unsigned state highway". On January 7, 2019, control over Westnedge Avenue and Park Street in the city of Kalamazoo was transferred from MDOT to the city. As a result, the M-331 designation was decommissioned.

Major intersections

See also

References

External links

M-331 at Michigan Highways
Rationalization process at Michigan Highways

331
Transportation in Kalamazoo County, Michigan